Crompton Cricket Club are an English cricket team, based in Shaw and Crompton, Greater Manchester, England. The club plays its home games at Glebe Street and competed in the Central Lancashire League until 2017.

From start of the 2018 season Crompton moved to the Lancashire League.

Honours
First Division: 1902, 1918, 1954, 1965 (shared)
Wood Cup: 1980
Second Division: 1911, 1919, 1927

References

External links
CLL club information
Crompton Cricket Club homepage

1896 establishments in England
Central Lancashire League cricket clubs
Lancashire League cricket clubs
Cricket in Greater Manchester
Shaw and Crompton
Sport in the Metropolitan Borough of Oldham
Cricket clubs established in 1896